Varikuppala Yadagiri is a well known singer, music director and lyricist  in the Telugu film industry.  He is from renjal near bodhan of Nizamabad district Telangana in India.

He got a wider publicity with popular hit movie Bachelors, released in 2000 as a singer and lyricist, though he started his lyricist career with the movie,

V. Yadagiri composed songs as a music director for movies like Bhageerathudu and Oka Ammai Oka Abbai, Kotha Katha, Ayomayam Apartment, He Prabhu Dekhade (Oriya), Nuvvante Nenani, etc.

Filmography

Lyricist
1*Sampangi(all songs 6)

2*Premapallaki(2)

3* Bachelors 2000(3)

4* Ishtam in 2001(1)

5* Thotti Gang in 2002(1)

6* Premalo Pavani Kalyan in 2002(3)

7* Evadi Gola Vadidi 2005(1)

8* Aadhi Lakshmi in 2006(1)

9* Gnapakam in 2007(ALL SONGS 7)

10* Pellaindhi Kani in 2007(1)

11* Student in 2007(2)

12* Sawaal in 2008.(1)

13* Manjeera in 2009.(1)

14* Abhimani(ALL SONGS 7)

15* Bhageerathudu in 2010(7SONGS)

16* Oka Ammayi Oka Abbayi 2011(ALL SONGS 5)

17* Race Gurram in 2014(3SONGS)

18* Power in2014(1)

19* Dongata(2)

20* Jadoogadu(3)

21* Charminar(2)

22* Kick 2(2)

23* Mandaram(ALL SONGS 7)

24* Rave Naa Cheliya(4)

25* Varam(4)

26* Kothakatha(ALL SONGS 5)

27* Current teega(1)

28* Goa(2)

29* Kuchi kuchi kunamma(2)

30* Manjeera(1)

31* Where is vidyabalan(1)

32*dictator (1)

33* shourya (2)

34*Dhruva(2)

35*katamarayudu(1)

36*Intelligent(1)

37*Marshal(8)

38*NAANNA NENU NAA BOYFRIENDS(1)

39*ARJUN SURAVARAM(4)

40*NIKU NAKU MADHYA18(1)

41*SUPPLEMENERY HERE WE COME AGAIN (UPCOMING)(5)

42*KRISHNASHTAMI(1)

43*2FRIENDS (2)

44*PIDUGU (2)

45*YUVA HRUDAYALU (4)

46*TAGITE TANDANA(2)

47*CHUTTALABBAYI(1)

48*SHER(1)

49* Husharu (1)

50*AYOMAYAM APARTMENTS (4)

51*KALIYUGA (4)

PRIVATE SONGS

1*RACHAKODA POLICE(PRIVATE) 
2 *NENUSAITAM (PRIVATE)
3*JANA GANA MANAMULALO (PRIVATE)
4*BALAPUR GANESH LADDU SONG (PRIVATE)
5*ANDARINI CHALLAGA CHUDU (DEVOTIONAL) 
6*MEMU SAITHAM (LAKSHMI REALITY SHOW)

Singer
1* Bachelors in 2000.(2)

2* Rave Naa Cheliya in 2001.(1)

3* Sampangi in 2001.(3)

4 * June July in 2002.(1)

5* Mandharam in 2002.(2)

6* Bhageerathudu in 2010(2)

7* Broker in 2010.(1)

8* Oka Ammayi Oka Abbayi 2011(5)

9* abhimani(2)

10* repallelo radha(1)

11* Mahatma (old)(1)

12* Power(1)

13*Dhruva(1)

14*Hushaaru (2018)(1)

15*ayomayam apartment (4)

16*supplementary (3)

17*vighnesh(1)

18*sambhavami yugeyuge(1)

19*ishtam(1)

Music Director
1*Bhageerathudu in 2010.

2*Oka Ammai Oka Abbai in 2011.

3*Abhimaani

4*KOTHA KATHA 2005

5*Nuvantey nenani (UPCOMING)

6* Husharu (2018)

7*Marshal (2019)

8*SUPPLEMENERY HERE WE COME AGAIN(UPCOMING)

9*HE PRABHU DEKHA DE (ODIYA)

10*AYOMAYAM APARTMENTS

NON MOVIE SONGS 
OKKADOCHHAADU (PAWAN KALYAN JANASENA SONG) 
RACHAKODA POLICE 
NENUSAITAM (TELANGANA POLICE SONG)
BALAPUR GANESH LADDU SONG 2019 
JANA GANA MANAMULALO (TELANGANA POLICE SONG)

SHORT FILMS 
CHIKATI
RAALLU
SEVEN
POTHTHILLALONCHI(DOCUMENTARY)

UN NAMED MUSIC DIRECTOR 
PREMA PALLAKI
BATCHLORS
RAAVE NAA CHELIYA
SAMPANGI
VARAM
NAANNA NENU NAA BOYFRIENDS
MANDARAM
RACE GURRAM
DICTATOR
POWER
KUCHI KUCHI KUNAMMA
DONGATA
ISHTAM
JADOOGADU

References
 http://www.ragalahari.com/newreleasesdetail.asp?newmvname=Bhageerathudu
 http://moviedost.com/telugu-movies-of/varikuppala-yadagiri
 http://www.raaga.com/channels/telugu/lyricist/V._Yadagiri_Goud.html
 http://www.radiokhushi.com/music/telugu_songs.cgi?lang=t&movie=bhageerathudu

Living people
Indian male playback singers
Telugu film score composers
Telugu playback singers
Telugu-language lyricists
Male film score composers
Year of birth missing (living people)